Events from the year 1600 in India.

Events
 East India Company granted Royal Charter by Elizabeth I of England (ran until disestablishment in 1874)
 Dhamapur Dam opened

Births

Deaths

See also

 Timeline of Indian history

References